This is the List of municipalities in Bingöl Province, Turkey .

References 

Geography of Bingöl Province
Bingol